Kangarban-e Olya (also Romanized as Kangarbān-e ‘Olyá; also known as Kangarbān, Kangarbān-e Bālā, and Kankarbān-e Bālā) is a village in Chaqa Narges Rural District, Mahidasht District, Kermanshah County, Kermanshah Province, Iran. At the 2006 census, its population was 160, in 43 families.

References 

Populated places in Kermanshah County